9-11: American Reflections is a 2001 documentary film that examines the attitudes of the American public in the wake of the  September 11 attacks in 2001. It is directed by Shireen Kadivar and edited by  Boris Elkis. The runtime is 50 minutes.

External links

2001 films
Documentary films about the September 11 attacks
2000s English-language films